The eyeball theorem is a statement in elementary geometry about a property of a pair of disjoined circles.

More precisely it states the following:
Then .

The eyeball theorem was discovered in 1960 by the Peruvian mathematician  Antonio Gutierrez.

 References  

Further reading 
Antonio Gutierrez: Eyeball theorems. In: Chris Pritchard (ed.): The Changing Shape of Geometry. Celebrating a Century of Geometry and Geometry Teaching''. Cambridge University Press, 2003, ISBN 9780521531627, pp. 274–280

External links 

The Eyeball Theorem at cut-the-knot.org (contains a variety of proofs)
 
Eyeball Theorem at Geometry from the Land of the Incas

Theorems about circles
Euclidean geometry